Western Creek is a locality and small rural community in the local government area of Meander Valley in the North West region of Tasmania.
The 2016 census determined a population of 116 for the state suburb of Western Creek.

History
The locality was originally known as Dalebrook. It was the site of one of the first water-powered sawmills in Tasmania.

Geography
Western Creek (the watercourse) and Dale Brook both run from south to north through the locality.

Road infrastructure
The C168 route (Dairy Plains Road) enters the locality from the north and exits to the north-west as Western Creek Road. The C166 route (Cheshunt Road) starts at an intersection with route C168 and exits to the north-east.

References

Localities of Meander Valley Council
Towns in Tasmania